Hesione was the name of a number of steamships
, sunk by a U-boat in 1915
, sold in 1937
, completed as Harmonides, torpedoed and sunk by a Japanese submarine in 1942
, scrapped in 1960

Ship names